is a passenger railway station located in the city of Akashi, Hyōgo Prefecture, Japan, operated by the private Sanyo Electric Railway. It is the only station that the meridian of the Japan Standard Time passes through.

Lines

Station layout
The station consists of one elevated island platform with the station building underneath. The station is unattended. The JR West Sanyo Main Line tracks passes parallel to the north side of the station.

Platforms

Adjacent stations

|-
!colspan=5|Sanyo Electric Railway

History
Hitomarumae Station opened on April 12, 1917.

Passenger statistics
In fiscal 2018, the station was used by an average of 795 passengers daily (boarding passengers only).

Surrounding area
Kakinomoto Shrine (Kakinomoto no Hitomaro Yukari) 
Gessho-ji Temple
Akashi Municipal Planetarium
Ryomagawa Battlefield Site (one of the places of the Genpei War)

See also
List of railway stations in Japan

References

External links

 Official website (Sanyo Electric Railway) 

Railway stations in Japan opened in 1917
Railway stations in Hyōgo Prefecture
Akashi, Hyōgo